Aurore Barry is an American screenwriter, film & music video director, and fashion entrepreneur.  A graduate of Loyola Marymount University's film school, Aurore first gained recognition for her Senior thesis film Adventures in the Mind of Jack Quimby, which was an official selection of the Palm Springs Shortfest.  In 2007, she cofounded the clothing line Daughters of the Revolution with designer Emily Cadenhead.  Aurore won the 2008 Duke City Shootout competition for her screenplay Mantrap, which was produced by the program with her directing, subsequently garnering a second award for production design.  She has written and directed music videos for several artists, including Ember FX, Ultra Vanity Testosterone, and Jan Lucanus.  At the 2013 San Diego Comic Con Superhero Kung Fu Extravaganza, it was announced that Aurore would co-write and co-direct an upcoming film production based on the acclaimed mixed martial arts comic book series JFH: Justice For Hire.

Aurore is the granddaughter of Congressman Robert R. Barry and the great-great-granddaughter of Standard Oil tycoon Henry Huttleston Rogers.

References

External links

Year of birth missing (living people)
Living people
Screenwriters from California
Film directors from California
American music video directors
American fashion businesspeople